John of Fermo, O.F.M., more often called John of La Verna, from his time spent on that mountain (1259 – 10 August 1322) was an Italian Franciscan friar, who was a noted ascetic and preacher.

Biography
John was born at Fermo in the March of Ancona. After a youth of precocious piety, he was received at the age of ten among the canons regular of the Priory of St. Peter's at Fermo. Three years later, desirous of leading a more austere life, he entered the Order of Friars Minor, and under the direction of a noted friar, James of Fallerone, soon made rapid progress in the spiritual life.

Shortly after his profession, John was sent by the Minister General of the Order to Mount La Verna in Tuscany, where Francis of Assisi had received the stigmata. There he spent many years in solitude, penance and contemplation, receiving ecstasies and celestial visions.

John's later years, however, were devoted to Christian ministry, and he preached at Florence, Pisa, Siena, Arezzo, Perugia and many other towns of northern and central Italy, working wonders everywhere. He was a close friend of the poet, Friar Jacopone of Todi, and administered the last rites to him in 1306.

John is said to have composed the Preface which is said in the Mass of St. Francis. Feeling the approach of death at Cortona while on his way to Assisi, John returned to La Verna and died there at the age of 63 in 1322.

Veneration
John was buried on the holy mountain, where many miracles were reportedly wrought through his intercession, and where his cell is still shown. The cultus of John was approved by Pope Leo XIII in 1880.

John's feast day is kept in the Order of Friars Minor on 9 August.

References

Attribution
 

1259 births
1322 deaths
People from Fermo
Italian Friars Minor
13th-century Italian Roman Catholic priests
14th-century Italian Roman Catholic priests
Franciscan beatified people
Italian beatified people
13th-century venerated Christians
14th-century venerated Christians
Burials in Tuscany